Hermitage Peak is a  peak in British Columbia, Canada. 
It is part of the Tower of London Range of the Muskwa Ranges in the Canadian Rockies.

References
Citations

Sources

Two-thousanders of British Columbia
Canadian Rockies
Peace River Land District